
Gmina Strzałkowo is a rural gmina (administrative district) in Słupca County, Greater Poland Voivodeship, in west-central Poland.

Villages
Gmina Strzałkowo contains the villages and settlements of Babin, Babin-Olędry, Bielawy, Brudzewo, Chwalibogowo, Chwałkowice, Ciosna, Gonice Drugie, Góry, Graboszewo, Janowo, Janowo-Cegielnia, Janowo-Olędry, Katarzynowo, Kokczyn Drugi, Kokczyn Pierwszy, Kornaty, Kościanki, Krępkowo, Łężec, Młodziejewice, Ostrowo Kościelne, Paruszewo, Podkornaty, Pospólno, Radłowo, Radłowo Leśne, Rudy, Sierakowo, Skąpe, Skarboszewo, Słomczyce, Staw, Staw II, Strzałkowo, Szemborowo, Unia, Uścięcin and Wólka.

Neighbouring gminas
Gmina Strzałkowo is bordered by the town of Słupca and by the gminas of Kołaczkowo, Powidz, Słupca, Witkowo and Września.

References
Polish official population figures 2006

Strzalkowo
Słupca County